Typhlops lumbricalis is a species of snake in the Typhlopidae family.

References

Typhlops
Reptiles described in 1758
Taxa named by Carl Linnaeus